, also known by the   and  , was a bureaucrat of the Ryukyu Kingdom. In some poems of Omoro Sōshi, he was mentioned and called .

Takushi Seiri was the third son of Tomigusuku Seishin, so he was a grandson of Gosamaru. He was also the first head of an aristocrat family called Mō-uji Uesato Dunchi.

Takushi served as Sanshikan during Shō Shin and Shō Sei's reign, and was trusted by the kings very much. He was dispatched as congratulatory envoy to Ming China to celebrate Jiajing Emperor's coronation in 1522. He bought a litter and a tap in China, and brought them back to Ryukyu in the next year.

References

1526 deaths
People of the Ryukyu Kingdom
Ryukyuan people
16th-century Ryukyuan people
Ueekata
Sanshikan